Battle of Armagideon (Millionaire Liquidator) is a studio album by reggae artist Mr. Lee 'Scratch' Perry and his backing group at the time, billed as the Upsetters .  The album was released in 1986 on the Trojan Records label.  It was re-released on CD in 1988 by Trojan, and on October 9, 2001 on the Sanctuary Records label.

Track listing 
All tracks by Lee "Scratch" Perry

 "Introducing Myself" – 4:19
 "Drum Song" – 4:42
 "Grooving" – 4:41
 "All Things Are Possible" – 2:33
 "Show Me That River" – 4:15
 "Time Marches On (In/Out Mix)" – 0:49
 "I Am a Madman" – 5:49
 "The Joker" – 3:37
 "Happy Birthday" – 5:11
 "Sexy Lady" – 3:17
 "Time Marches On" – 4:21

Personnel 

 The Upsetters:
 Lee "Scratch" Perry – Vocals, percussion, harmonica, producer
 Mark Downie (Marcus Upbeat) – rhythm guitar/synth, co-producer & cover artwork
 Tarlok Mann – Lead Guitar
 Russ Cummings – Keyboards
 Marac (Spike) Kolodzinski – Bass
 Kenneth (Peng) Smith – Drums
 Lloyd Clarke – alto saxophone
 Trevor Jones – trombone
 Jerry Tilley – Engineer
 Patrick Meads – Executive producer

References

External links 
 Amazon.com Album Info
 Roots Archives Album Info

1986 albums
Lee "Scratch" Perry albums
Albums produced by Lee "Scratch" Perry
Dub albums
Trojan Records albums